Don Diego de Castro Titu Cusi Yupanqui (Quechua: Titu Kusi Yupanki ; 1529–1571) was an Inca ruler of Vilcabamba and the penultimate leader of the Neo-Inca State. He was a son of Manco Inca Yupanqui,  He was crowned in 1563, after the death of his half brother, Sayri Tupac.  He ruled until his death in 1571, probably of pneumonia.

Rule 
During his rule at Vilcabamba, the provisional governor-general Lope Garcia de Castro wanted to negotiate with him. The negotiations were about Cusi leaving the Vilcabamba and accepting a Crown pension. After negotiations escalated, around 1568, Titu Cusi was baptized into the Roman Catholic Church, as Diego de Castro.

Titu Cusi made Túpac Amaru a priest and custodian of Manco Inca's body in Vilcabamba.

Túpac Amaru became the Inca ruler after Titu Cusi's death in 1571. Titu Cusi's close companion Martín de Pando, who had worked as a scribe for the Inca for over ten years and Augustinian Friar Diego Ortiz were blamed for killing Titu Cusi by poisoning him.  Both were killed.

Cusi is the "narrator" and source of An Inca Account of the Conquest of Peru, a firsthand account of the Spanish invasion, narrated by him in 1570 to Spanish missionary Fray Marcos García and transcribed by Martín de Pando, his mestizo assistant.

The resulting hybrid document offers a unique Inca perspective on the conquest. The confusion and misunderstandings of first contact are described in the account, including beliefs that the Spaniards were gods. The section that describes the moment when Manco Inca, the father of the author and the brother of Atahualpa, receives the first news of the Spaniards' arrival from coastal tribesman is of particular note.

References

Sources 

 An Inca Account of the Conquest of Peru by Titu Cusi Yupanqui, trans. Ralph Bauer 
 Andean Worlds by Kenneth J. Andrien.

External links
 Castro Tito Cusi Yupanqui, Diego de,  — 1570
 Jacobs, James Q. Tupac Amaru, The Life, Times, and Execution of the Last Inca.

1529 births
1571 deaths
Inca emperors
Roman Catholic monarchs
16th-century monarchs in South America
Deaths from pneumonia in Peru